Sheldrick may refer to:

People
Daphne Sheldrick (1934–2018), Kenyan author, conservationist, and animal husbandry expert
David Sheldrick (1919–1977), Kenyan  farmer and park warden
J.G. Sheldrick ( early 20th century), U.S. surveyor (see Max, North Dakota)
William Sheldrick Conover, the II (born 1928), U.S. politician

Other
David Sheldrick Wildlife Trust, Kenyan wildlife conservation charity
Sheldrick Forest Preserve, in New Hampshire, U.S.